The San Francisco Mercantile Library Association (est. 1852) was a civic group organized in San Francisco, California, to "stimulate a generous rivalry in mental culture, by rendering it the fashion to read and converse on literary topics." Its founders J.B. Crockett, F.A. Woodworth, and F.C. Ewer aspired to "make our infant city as distinguished for literature and science as it already is for its commerce and wealth." By 1854 the group had collected for its library some 3,000 volumes. The library grew to 14,000 volumes by 1861, and to 36,000 by 1874. Holdings included travel writing, essays, plays, California history, American history, and literature by Chaucer, Shakespeare, and Sainte-Beuve. In 1906 the association merged into the San Francisco Mechanics' Institute. Later the same year an earthquake disaster ruined the combined collections. The Institute constructed a new Mechanics'-Mercantile Library building in 1910.

References

Further reading
 
 
 
 Annual Reports. 1886, 1890s

External links

 University of California, Berkeley. Bancroft Library. Mercantile Library Association of San Francisco records, 1850-1894

1852 establishments in California
1906 disestablishments in California
Libraries established in 1852
Libraries disestablished in 1906
Defunct clubs and societies of the United States
Libraries in San Francisco
Defunct libraries
History of San Francisco